State Road 263 is a business route of State Road 63 which runs through West Lebanon in Warren County, covering a distance of about .  It is an undivided two-lane surface road for its entire length.

Route description
At the south end, State Road 263 leaves State Road 63 less than a mile north of U.S. Route 136.  It passes under the Vermilion Valley Railroad after about a quarter of a mile, and for the next several miles it runs northeast through wooded country, staying within a mile of the Wabash River to the east and passing through the defunct river town of Baltimore.  It then leaves the river and strikes north toward the town of West Lebanon, passing through some hilly and wooded country as it ascends from the river.

Upon reaching the south edge of West Lebanon (the portion locally known as "Old Town"), State Road 263 is concurrent with High Street; it crosses a Norfolk Southern railway in the north part of town and intersects State Road 28 at the north edge of town.  The remaining portion of the highway runs through open country and passes just to the east of Seeger Memorial Junior-Senior High School and Warren Central Elementary School, and finally rejoins State Road 63 about a mile further north, just beyond Division Road.

History
State Road 263 is a portion of the original route of State Road 63.  The new four-lane divided highway was constructed to the west in the early 1970s and was often called "New 63" by residents of the area; the resulting business route officially named State Road 263 was often called "Old 63".  Some locals still use these names.

Major intersections

References

External links

 Indiana Highway Ends - SR 263

263
Transportation in Warren County, Indiana